Tzanis Stavrakopoulos (born October 30, 1971) is a Greek former professional basketball player. At a height of 2.02 m (6'7 "), he played at the small forward and power forward positions.

Professional career
Stavrakopoulos started his club playing career with Ampelokipoi, in the Greek minors, at the age of 16. He led the team to be promoted all the way up from the local ESKA category, to the top-tier A1 professional level Greek League. In 1995, he moved to the Greek club Panathinaikos Athens, and with them he won the EuroLeague championship, at the 1996 EuroLeague Final Four.

In the next season, he played with Aris Thessaloniki. With Aris, he won the championship of the FIBA Korać Cup's 1996–97 season. In the 1997–98 season, he played for the French League club Le Mans, and one year later, he played for the Greek club Panionios. 
Stavrakopoulos also played with the Greek clubs Dafni, Ionikos NF, and Peristeri, where he played during the Greek 2nd Division's 2004–05 season.

After that, Stavrakopoulos played for several more teams in the Greek minors.

National team career
Stavrakopoulos played with Greece's junior national team at the 1993 FIBA Under-21 World Cup. He also played with the senior Greek national team at the 1995 EuroBasket.

References

External links 
FIBA Archive Profile
FIBA Europe Profile
ProBallers.com Profile
Eurobasket.com Profile
Hellinic Basketball Federation Profile 

1971 births
Living people
Ampelokipoi B.C. players
Aris B.C. players
Dafnis B.C. players
Greek Basket League players
Greek men's basketball players
Ionikos N.F. B.C. players
Le Mans Sarthe Basket players
Panathinaikos B.C. players
Panionios B.C. players
Peristeri B.C. players
Small forwards
Power forwards (basketball)